Alonso López (born 27 May 1957) is a Colombian footballer. He played in one match for the Colombia national football team in 1985. He was also part of Colombia's squad for the 1975 Copa América tournament.

References

1957 births
Living people
Colombian footballers
Colombia international footballers
Place of birth missing (living people)
Association football defenders
Millonarios F.C. players
Independiente Medellín footballers
Once Caldas footballers